Thespies (before 1934:  Erimókastro) is a village in Boeotia, Greece. A former municipality, which included the village, shared the same name. Since the 2011 local government reform it is part of the municipality Aliartos, of which it is a municipal unit. Population 4,793 (2011). The municipal unit has an area of 108.152 km2, the community 12.725 km2.

Thespies is named after the ancient city of Thespiae. Thespies or then Erimokastro used to be an Arvanite settlement of 1.095 people in 1907.

References

Populated places in Boeotia